is a Japanese mixed martial artist who currently competes in the Rizin Fighting Federation. A professional competitor since 2010, he formerly competed for Ultimate Fighting Championship, Shooto, DEEP, and Vale Tudo Japan. He is the former Shooto Pacific Rim (132 lbs) Champion.

Background
Born and raised in Shizuoka, Sasaki was a talented wrestler and also began training in Brazilian jiu-jitsu from a young age. He wrestled for three seasons at Hiryu High School, finishing in the top 16 at the All-Japan High School Greco-Roman Wrestling Championships, and in 2009 Sasaki won the All-Japan Combat Wrestling Open Championships for the under 66 kg division. That same year, he also finished second at the All-Japan Amateur Shooto Championships. Later in 2013, Sasaki won the ADCC Japan Trial for the under 66 kg division.

Mixed martial arts career

Shooto
Sasaki started his professional career in 2010. He fought mainly for Shooto, but also fought for DEEP and GCM early in his career.

Sasaki faced Yo Saito on December 18, 2010, at Shooto: The Rookie Tournament 2010 Final. He defeated Saito via unanimous decision after two rounds and became the 2010 Shooto 143-pound rookie champion.

Sasaki faced Tetsu Suzuki on January 20, 2013, at Shooto: 1st Round 2013 for the Shooto Pacific Rim 132-pound title. He won via unanimous decision and became the new champion.

Sasaki defended his title on July 27, 2013, at Shooto: 3rd Round 2013 against Kenji Yamamoto. He won via knockout at 11 seconds in the first round and retained the title. Shortly after the bout, Sasaki relinquished his title in order to be able to fight for Shooto's world title.

Sasaki faced current ZST 132 lb champion Keisuke Fujiwara on January 13, 2014, at Shooto: 1st Round 2014. He won via submission due to a rear-naked choke in the first round.

Ultimate Fighting Championship
In July 2014, it was announced that Sasaki had signed with the UFC. He made his debut against Roland Delorme at UFC Fight Night 48 on August 23, 2014. Sasaki won via submission in the first round.  The win also earned Sasaki his first Performance of the Night bonus award.

Sasaki faced Leandro Issa on December 20, 2014, at UFC Fight Night 58. He lost the fight by submission in the second round.

Sasaki faced Taylor Lapilus on June 20, 2015, at UFC Fight Night 69. He lost the fight via TKO in the second round.

Sasaki faced Willie Gates May 8, 2016, at UFC Fight Night 87. He won the fight via submission in the second round.

Sasaki was expected to face Matheus Nicolau on November 19, 2016, at UFC Fight Night 100. However, on November 3, Nicolau was pulled from the bout after USADA revealed a potential anti-doping violation from a sample taken October 13.

Sasaki next faced Wilson Reis on February 11, 2017, at UFC 208. He lost the fight by unanimous decision.

Sasaki faced Justin Scoggins on June 17, 2017 at UFC Fight Night: Holm vs. Correia. Sasaki suffered almost two rounds of damage but managed to sink his arm around Scoggins' neck and submitted him via a rear-naked choke in the second round to win the fight. This fight won Sasaki his second Performance of the Night bonus award.

Sasaki faced Jussier Formiga on September 23, 2017 at UFC Fight Night: Saint Preux vs. Okami. He lost the fight via submission in the first round.

Sasaki was scheduled to face Magomed Bibulatov on April 21, 2018 at UFC Fight Night 128. However, Bibulatov was removed from the card due to back injury, and the bout was cancelled.

Sasaki faced Jenel Lausa on June 23, 2018 at UFC Fight Night 132. He won the fight in round two via a rear-naked choke submission.

Sasaki faced Alexandre Pantoja on November 17, 2018 at UFC Fight Night 140. He lost the fight via rear-naked choke submission in the first round.

Rizin FF
Sasaki faced Manel Kape in a 130lbs catchweight bout at Rizin 14 on December 31, 2018. He won the fight by unanimous decision.

Sasaki was then scheduled to face Kai Asakura at Rizin 15 on April 21, 2019. However, Sasaki was forced to withdraw from the bout due to a visceral injury and was replaced by Justin Scoggins.

He then faced Shintaro Ishiwatari at Rizin 17 on July 28, 2019. Sasaki lost the fight via second-round submission.

The fight with Kai Asakura was then rebooked to take place at Rizin 19 on October 12, 2019. Sasaki lost the fight via first-minute technical knockout due to a broken jaw.

After recovering from two jaw surgeries to repair the damage sustained in his previous fight, Sasaki faced Kenta Takizawa at Rizin 26 on December 31, 2020. He won the fight via unanimous decision.

Sasaki faced Yoshinori Horie at Rizin 30 on September 19, 2021. He lost the bout via unanimous decision.

Sasaki headlined Rizin Trigger 2 on February 23, 2022 against Kleber Koike Erbst. Even after finding initial success with the stand-up in the first round, Sasaki lost the bout in the second round via rear-naked choke.

Sasaki was expected to face Yoshiki Nakahara at Rizin 37 on July 31, 2022. He withdrew from the fight on July 26, after he tested positive for COVID-19.

Championships and accomplishments

Mixed martial arts
Shooto
Shooto Pacific Rim 132 lb title (One time)
One successful title defense
Shooto rookie 143 lb champion (2010)
Ultimate Fighting Championship
Performance of the Night (Two times) Roland Delorme and Justin Scoggins

Grappling
ADCC Asia & Oceania Champion
2013 ADCC Asia trials  (66 kg)

Mixed martial arts record

|-
|Loss
|align=center|23–10–2
|Kleber Koike Erbst
|Submission (rear-naked choke)
|Rizin Trigger 2
|
|align=center|2
|align=center|3:22
|Fukuroi, Japan
|
|-
|Loss
|align=center|23–9–2
|Yoshinori Horie
|Decision (unanimous)
|Rizin 30
|
|align=center|3
|align=center|5:00
|Saitama, Japan
|
|-
|Win
|align=center|23–8–2
| Kenta Takizawa
|Decision (unanimous)
|Rizin 26
|
|align=center|3
|align=center|5:00
|Saitama, Japan
|
|-
|Loss
|align=center|22–8–2
|Kai Asakura
|TKO (broken jaw) 
|Rizin 19
|
|align=center|1
|align=center|0:54
|Osaka, Japan
|
|-
|Loss
|align=center|22–7–2
|Shintaro Ishiwatari
|Submission (north-south choke)
|Rizin 17
|
|align=center|2
|align=center|8:58
|Saitama, Japan
|
|-
|Win
| align=center|22–6–2
|Manel Kape
| Decision (unanimous) 
|Rizin 14
|
|align=center|3
|align=center|5:00
|Saitama, Japan
|
|-
|Loss
|align=center|21–6–2
|Alexandre Pantoja
|Submission (rear-naked choke)
|UFC Fight Night: Magny vs. Ponzinibbio 
|
|align=center|1
|align=center|2:18
|Buenos Aires, Argentina
|
|-
|Win
|align=center|21–5–2
|Jenel Lausa
|Submission (rear-naked choke)
|UFC Fight Night: Cowboy vs. Edwards
|
|align=center|2
|align=center|4:04
|Kallang, Singapore
|
|-
|Loss
|align=center|20–5–2
|Jussier Formiga
|Submission (rear-naked choke)
|UFC Fight Night: Saint Preux vs. Okami 
|
|align=center|1
|align=center|4:30
|Saitama, Japan
|
|-
|Win
|align=center|20–4–2
|Justin Scoggins
|Submission (rear-naked choke)
|UFC Fight Night: Holm vs. Correia
|
|align=center|2
|align=center|3:19
|Kallang, Singapore
|
|-
|Loss
| align=center|19–4–2
| Wilson Reis
| Decision (unanimous) 
| UFC 208
| 
| align=center|3
| align=center|5:00
| Brooklyn, New York, United States
|
|-
| Win
| align=center|19–3–2
| Willie Gates
| Submission (rear-naked choke)
| UFC Fight Night: Overeem vs. Arlovski
| 
| align=center|2
| align=center|2:30
| Rotterdam, Netherlands
| 
|-
| Loss
| align=center| 18–3–2
| Taylor Lapilus
| TKO (punches)
| UFC Fight Night: Jedrzejczyk vs. Penne
| 
| align=center| 2
| align=center| 1:26
| Berlin, Germany
|
|-
| Loss
| align=center| 18–2–2
| Leandro Issa
| Submission (neck crank)
| UFC Fight Night: Machida vs. Dollaway
| 
| align=center| 2
| align=center| 4:13
| Barueri, Brazil
|
|-
| Win
| align=center| 18–1–2
| Roland Delorme
| Submission (rear-naked choke)
| UFC Fight Night: Bisping vs. Le
| 
| align=center| 1
| align=center| 1:06
| Macau, SAR, China
| 
|-
| Win
| align=center| 17–1–2
| Hong Jung-Gi
| KO (punches)
| DEEP: Fujisan Festival
| 
| align=center| 1
| align=center| 0:38
| Fuji, Japan
|
|-
| Win
| align=center| 16–1–2
| Teruto Ishihara
| Technical Submission (rear-naked choke)
| Vale Tudo Japan 4th
| 
| align=center| 2
| align=center| 1:46
| Tokyo, Japan
|
|-
| Win
| align=center| 15–1–2
| Keisuke Fujiwara
| Submission (rear-naked choke)
| Shooto: 1st Round 2014
| 
| align=center| 1
| align=center| 4:35
| Tokyo, Japan
|
|-
| Win
| align=center| 14–1–2
| Geun Do Park
| Submission (rear-naked choke)
| Vale Tudo Japan 3rd
| 
| align=center| 1
| align=center| 1:36
| Ota, Japan
|
|-
| Win
| align=center| 13–1–2
| Kenji Yamamoto
| KO (punch)
| Shooto: 3rd Round 2013
| 
| align=center| 1
| align=center| 0:11
| Tokyo, Japan
| 
|-
| Win
| align=center| 12–1–2
| Kota Onojima
| Decision (majority)
| Shooto: Gig Tokyo 14
| 
| align=center| 3
| align=center| 5:00
| Tokyo, Japan
| 
|-
| Win
| align=center| 11–1–2
| Tetsu Suzuki
| Decision (unanimous)
| Shooto: 1st Round 2013
| 
| align=center| 3
| align=center| 5:00
| Tokyo, Japan
| 
|-
| Draw
| align=center| 10–1–2
| Manabu Inoue
| Draw (majority)
| Shooto: 12th Round
| 
| align=center| 3
| align=center| 5:00
| Tokyo, Japan
|
|-
| Win
| align=center| 10–1–1
| Teruyuki Matsumoto
| Submission (guillotine choke)
| Shooto: Gig Tokyo 10
| 
| align=center| 1
| align=center| 0:42
| Tokyo, Japan
|
|-
| Win
| align=center| 9–1–1
| Kazuhiro Ito
| Submission (rear-naked choke)
| Shooto: Gig Tokyo 9
| 
| align=center| 2
| align=center| 3:34
| Tokyo, Japan
|
|-
| Win
| align=center| 8–1–1
| Satoshi Watanabe
| Decision (unanimous)
| DEEP: Fujisan Festival
| 
| align=center| 2
| align=center| 5:00
| Fuji, Japan
|
|-
| Loss
| align=center| 7–1–1
| Guy Delumeau
| Decision (unanimous)
| Shooto: Shootor's Legacy 4
| 
| align=center| 3
| align=center| 5:00
| Tokyo, Japan
|
|-
| Win
| align=center| 7–0–1
| Kosuke Kindaichi
| Decision (majority)
| Shooto: Shootor's Legacy 3
| 
| align=center| 2
| align=center| 5:00
| Tokyo, Japan
|
|-
| Win
| align=center| 6–0–1
| Yoshifumi Nakamura
| Decision (majority)
| Shooto: Shootor's Legacy 2
| 
| align=center| 2
| align=center| 5:00
| Tokyo, Japan
|
|-
| Draw
| align=center| 5–0–1
| Yusuke Kagiyama
| Draw
| DEEP: Shizuoka Impact 2011
| 
| align=center| 2
| align=center| 5:00
| Shizuoka, Japan
|
|-
| Win
| align=center| 5–0
| Yo Saito
| Decision (unanimous)
| Shooto: The Rookie Tournament 2010 Final
| 
| align=center| 2
| align=center| 5:00
| Tokyo, Japan
| 
|-
| Win
| align=center| 4–0
| Motohiro Takenawa
| Decision (unanimous)
| Shooto: Kitazawa Shooto Vol. 4
| 
| align=center| 2
| align=center| 5:00
| Tokyo, Japan
|
|-
| Win
| align=center| 3–0
| Keiji Sakuta
| Submission (rear-naked choke)
| GCM: Cage Force Preliminary Festival 1
| 
| align=center| 3
| align=center| 1:03
| Tokyo, Japan
|
|-
| Win
| align=center| 2–0
| Shinji Maeguchi
| Submission (rear-naked choke)
| Shooto: Gig Central 20
| 
| align=center| 2
| align=center| 1:24
| Nagoya, Japan
|
|-
| Win
| align=center| 1–0
| Atsushi Masukura
| Submission (rear-naked choke)
| GCM: Cage Force 16
| 
| align=center| 1
| align=center| 0:30
| Tokyo, Japan
|

See also

 List of current Rizin FF fighters
 List of male mixed martial artists
 List of UFC bonus award recipients

References

External links
 
 

1989 births
Living people
People from Numazu, Shizuoka
Japanese practitioners of Brazilian jiu-jitsu
Japanese male mixed martial artists
Bantamweight mixed martial artists
Flyweight mixed martial artists
Mixed martial artists utilizing shootfighting
Mixed martial artists utilizing wrestling
Mixed martial artists utilizing Brazilian jiu-jitsu
Ultimate Fighting Championship male fighters